Pseudalcantarea viridiflora is a species of flowering plant in the family Bromeliaceae, native to Mexico and Central America (Guatemala, Honduras and Nicaragua). It was first described by Johann Georg Beer (as Platystachys viridiflora) in 1856.

, the Encyclopaedia of Bromeliads regarded Vriesea billbergiae Lem. and Tillandsia billbergiae (Lem.) Baker as synonyms of Pseudalcantarea viridiflora, whereas Plants of the World Online regarded them as unplaced.

References

Tillandsioideae
Flora of Mexico
Flora of Central America
Epiphytes
Plants described in 1856